Ralf Bißdorf (born 15 March 1971) is a German former fencer. He won a silver medal in the individual foil event at the 2000 Summer Olympics.

References

External links
 

1971 births
Living people
German male fencers
Olympic fencers of Germany
Fencers at the 2000 Summer Olympics
Fencers at the 2004 Summer Olympics
Olympic silver medalists for Germany
Olympic medalists in fencing
People from Heidenheim (district)
Sportspeople from Stuttgart (region)
Medalists at the 2000 Summer Olympics
21st-century German people